The Wishing Horse of Oz (1935) is the twenty-ninth in the series of Oz books created by L. Frank Baum and his successors, and the fifteenth written by Ruth Plumly Thompson. It was Illustrated by John R. Neill. This book marked the point at which Thompson had written more Oz books than Baum himself.

This Oz mystery starts in the small, poor kingdom of Skampavia, where King Skamperoo wishes for a horse using enchanted emerald necklaces. When Chalk, a talking Horse from Oz, falls from the sky, Skamperoo decides the emeralds must be from the Emerald City, and decides to conquer all of Oz.  He magically causes all the residents of Oz to forget their rightful rulers and accept him as their emperor instead. Only Dorothy and Pigasus, the flying pig, are able to remember Princess Ozma, the true ruler of Oz, and together they set out to rescue her.  The mystery in this story is how to make the necklaces grant wishes; only the horse Chalk knows how to do this.

This was the last Oz book to feature illustrations in color, and only the first edition and the International Wizard of Oz Club edition (1990) have them.

Copyright status
This book, along with Thompson's next four, did not get renewed for copyright, making them public domain and freely readable online.

References

External links
 
 
 On The Wishing Horse of Oz

Oz (franchise) books
1935 American novels
1935 children's books
1935 fantasy novels
Fictional horses